Gudrun Hauss (born 17 April 1948 in Viersen) is a former West German pair skater. With partner Walter Häfner, she finished fourth at both the 1967 European Figure Skating Championships and World Figure Skating Championships.  They finished eighth at the 1968 Winter Olympics and won the gold medal at the German Figure Skating Championships in 1969.

Results
(with Häfner)

References

1948 births
People from Viersen
Sportspeople from Düsseldorf (region)
German female pair skaters
Figure skaters at the 1968 Winter Olympics
Olympic figure skaters of West Germany
Living people